The Claude Fouke House was a historic house at 501 Pecan Street in Texarkana, Arkansas.  It was a two-story brick structure with a hip roof, set on a raised corner lot.  It was one of the city's most elaborate Classical Revival structures, with a monumental temple front supported by pairs of fluted Ionic columns rising to the full height of the facade.  The roof had an elaborate modillioned cornice, with a small triangular pediment containing a half-round window.  The interior of the house contained equally impressive woodwork.  The house was built in 1903 by Claude Fouke, the son of railroad baron George Fouke.

The house was listed on the National Register of Historic Places in 1982.

After 28 months of neglect by the owner, Beech Street First Baptist Church, the structure was demolished and the debris removed in March 2022.  It was delisted in September 2022.

See also
 Fouke, Arkansas
 National Register of Historic Places listings in Miller County, Arkansas

Notes

References

External links 
 Claude W. Fouke & his father, George W. Fouke American Lumberman, October 5, 1918.

Houses on the National Register of Historic Places in Arkansas
Neoclassical architecture in Arkansas
Houses completed in 1903
Houses in Miller County, Arkansas
National Register of Historic Places in Miller County, Arkansas
Buildings and structures in Texarkana, Arkansas
Former National Register of Historic Places in Arkansas